Modular origami or unit origami is a paperfolding technique which uses two or more sheets of paper to create a larger and more complex structure than would be possible using single-piece origami techniques. Each individual sheet of paper is folded into a module, or unit, and then modules are assembled into an integrated flat shape or three-dimensional structure, usually by inserting flaps into pockets created by the folding process. These insertions create tension or friction that holds the model together.

Definition and restrictions

Modular origami can be classified as a sub-set of multi-piece origami, since the rule of restriction to one sheet of paper is abandoned. However, all the other rules of origami still apply, so the use of glue, thread, or any other fastening that is not a part of the sheet of paper is not generally acceptable in modular origami.

The additional restrictions that distinguish modular origami from other forms of multi-piece origami are using many identical copies of any folded unit, and linking them together in a symmetrical or repeating fashion to complete the model. There is a common misconception that treats all multi-piece origami as modular.

More than one type of module can still be used. Typically this means using separate linking units hidden from sight to hold parts of the construction together. Any other usage is generally discouraged.

History

The first historical evidence for a modular origami design comes from a Japanese book by Hayato Ohoka published in 1734 called Ranma Zushiki. It contains a print that shows a group of traditional origami models, one of which is a modular cube. The cube is pictured twice (from slightly different angles) and is identified in the accompanying text as a tamatebako (magic treasure chest).  Isao Honda's World of Origami (published in 1965) appears to have the same model, where it is called a "cubical box". The six modules required for this design were developed from the traditional Japanese paperfold commonly known as the menko. Each module forms one face of the finished cube.

There are several other traditional Japanese modular designs, including balls of folded paper flowers known as kusudama, or medicine balls. These designs are not integrated and are commonly strung together with thread. The term kusudama is sometimes, rather inaccurately, used to describe any three-dimensional modular origami structure resembling a ball.

There are also a few modular designs in the Chinese paperfolding tradition, notably the pagoda (from Maying Soong) and the lotus made from Joss paper.

Most traditional designs are however single-piece and the possibilities inherent in the modular origami idea were not explored further until the 1960s when the technique was re-invented by Robert Neale in the US and later by Mitsunobu Sonobe in Japan. The 1970s saw a sudden period of interest and development in modular origami as its own distinct field, leading to its present status in origami folding. One notable figure is Steve Krimball, who discovered the potential in  Sonobe's cube unit and demonstrated that it could be used to make alternative polyhedral shapes, including a 30-piece ball.

Since then, the modular origami technique has been popularized and developed extensively, and now there have been thousands of designs developed in this repertoire.

Notable modular paperfolders include Robert Neale, Sonobe, Tomoko Fuse, Kunihiko Kasahara, Tom Hull, Heinz Strobl and Ekaterina Lukasheva.

Types

Modular origami forms may be flat or three-dimensional. Flat forms are usually polygons (sometimes known as coasters), stars, rotors, and rings. Three-dimensional forms tend to be regular polyhedra or tessellations of simple polyhedra.

Modular origami techniques can be used to create lidded boxes which are not only beautiful but also useful as containers for gifts.  Many examples of such boxes are shown in Fabulous Origami Boxes by Tomoko Fuse.

There are some modular origami that are approximations of fractals, such as Menger's sponge.
Macro-modular origami is a form of modular origami in which finished assemblies are themselves used as the building blocks to create larger integrated structures. Such structures are described in Tomoko Fuse's book Unit Origami-Multidimensional Transformations (published in 1990).

Modeling systems

Robert Neale's penultimate module
Neale developed a system to model equilateral polyhedra based on a module with variable vertex angles. Each module has two pockets and two tabs, on opposite sides. The angle of each tab can be changed independently of the other tab. Each pocket can receive tabs of any angle. The most common angles form polygonal faces:

 60 degrees (triangle)
 90 degrees (square)
 108 degrees (pentagon)
 120 degrees (hexagon)

Each module joins others at the vertices of a polyhedron to form a polygonal face. The tabs form angles on opposite sides of an edge. For example, a subassembly of three triangle corners forms a triangle, the most stable configuration. As the internal angle increases for squares, pentagons and so forth, the stability decreases.

Many polyhedra call for unalike adjacent polygons. For example, a pyramid has one square face and four triangular faces. This requires hybrid modules, or modules having different angles. A pyramid consists of eight modules, four modules as square-triangle, and four as triangle-triangle.

Further polygonal faces are possible by altering the angle at each corner. The Neale modules can form any equilateral polyhedron including those having rhombic faces, like the rhombic dodecahedron.

Mukhopadhyay module
The Mukhopadhyay module can form any equilateral polyhedron. Each unit has a middle crease that forms an edge, and triangular wings that form adjacent stellated faces. For example, a cuboctahedral assembly has 24 units, since the cuboctahedron has 24 edges.
Additionally, bipyramids are possible, by folding the central crease on each module outwards or convexly instead of inwards or concavely as for the icosahedron and other stellated polyhedra. The Mukhopadhyay module works best when glued together, especially for polyhedra having larger numbers of sides.

Notes and references

Bibliography

External links

 3dOrigamiArt.com Learn how to 3d Origami, tutorials and artist network.
  3D origami video tutorials by Arthur Vershigora.
 Kusudama Pictures
 Photo Gallery and Folding Instructions For Many Polyhedra and Variations
 Image of Menger's Sponge in origami
 Modular origami page
 Origami Geosphere Paper model of a Geodesic Sphere.
 Mukhopadhyay's super simple isosceles triangle module
 James S. Plank's Penultimate Modular Origami
 Oxi Module by Michał Kosmulski
 Kusudama Me! Kusudamas of Lukasheva Ekaterina, also diagrams and tutorials
 Paper Structures by Krystyna and Wojtek Burczyk
 Kusudama by Mikhail Puzakov & Ludmila Puzakova: models, folding instruction, history, geometry

Origami
Origami